The Ojibway Correctional Facility was a state prison for men located in Marenisco Township, Gogebic County, Michigan, owned and operated by the Michigan Department of Corrections.  

The facility was first opened in 1971 as Camp Ojibway, and converted to an enclosed prison in 2000.  It had a working capacity of 1,180 prisoners held at a minimum security level. It was closed on 1 December 2018.

References

Prisons in Michigan
Buildings and structures in Gogebic County, Michigan
1971 establishments in Michigan